Cataldo is both an Italian personal name and surname. Notable people with the name include:

Given name:
Catald, saint 
Cataldo Salerno, Italian politician
Cataldo Cozza, Italian-German footballer
Cataldo Amodei, Italian composer

Surname:
Dominick Cataldo, Sicilian-American mafioso
Joseph Cataldo, Italian-American Jesuit, founder of Gonzaga University
Dario Cataldo, Italian cyclist
Philippe Cataldo, French singer
Giuseppe Cataldo, Italian gangster of the Cataldo 'ndrina

See also
 Cataldo (disambiguation)
 Cataldi
 San Cataldo (disambiguation),